The 2005 Danish Cup Final was the final and deciding match of the Danish Cup 2004-05. It took place on Thursday 5 May 2005 at Parken Stadium in Copenhagen and saw the Superliga leaders Brøndby IF beat no. 3 in the league FC Midtjylland after extra time. 

Brøndby have won the Cup on four previous occasions (1989, 1994, 1998 and 2003). Midtjylland have never won the Cup.

Referee Knud Erik Fisker officiated the match.

Road to Copenhagen

 Both teams started in fifth round.
 Square brackets [ ] represent the opposition's division.

Match facts

See also
Danish Cup 2004-05 for details of the current competition.

External links
 Match facts at Brøndby IF
 Match report at FC Midtjylland
 Match facts at Haslund.info

Danish Cup Finals
Danish Cup Final 2005
Danish Cup Final 2005
Cup
Sports competitions in Copenhagen
May 2005 sports events in Europe
2005 in Copenhagen